Jenílson Ângelo de Souza (born 20 June 1973), usually known as Júnior, is a Brazilian former association footballer who played as a left back.

Club career
Júnior spent his early years playing for Brazilian clubs Vitória and Palmeiras before moving to Italy and playing for Parma and Siena from 2000 to 2004. He spent his later career at Goiás, in the Brazilian Série A. During his time at Parma he won the 2001–02 Coppa Italia and scored the decisive goal in the second leg of the final which allowed Parma to defeat Juventus on away goals.

International career
With the Brazil national football team, Júnior obtained nineteen international caps between 1996 and 2004, scoring one goal, which came against Costa Rica in the nation's victorious 2002 FIFA World Cup campaign. He was also previously a member of the Brazilian squads that took part at the 1998 CONCACAF Gold Cup and the 2001 Copa América.

Career statistics

International

International goal

Honours

Club
Vitória
Bahia State League: 1995

Palmeiras
São Paulo State League: 1996
Copa do Brasil: 1998
Copa Mercosur: 1998
Copa Libertadores: 1999
Torneio Rio-São Paulo: 2000
Brazilian Copa dos Campeões: 2000

Parma
Coppa Italia: 2001–02

São Paulo
São Paulo State League: 2005
Copa Libertadores: 2005
FIFA Club World Cup: 2005
Brazilian League: 2006, 2007, 2008

International
Brazil
FIFA World Cup: 2002

Individual
Brazilian Bola de Prata (Placar): 1998

References

External links
globoesporte.globo.com 
saopaulofc.net 
CBF 

1973 births
Living people
Brazilian footballers
Brazilian expatriate footballers
1998 CONCACAF Gold Cup players
2001 Copa América players
2002 FIFA World Cup players
Copa Libertadores-winning players
FIFA World Cup-winning players
Sociedade Esportiva Palmeiras players
Parma Calcio 1913 players
São Paulo FC players
A.C.N. Siena 1904 players
Esporte Clube Vitória players
Clube Atlético Mineiro players
Goiás Esporte Clube players
Brazil international footballers
Expatriate footballers in Italy
Campeonato Brasileiro Série A players
Serie A players
Association football defenders